Joseph Beckham Cobb (April 11, 1819September 15, 1858) was an American writer and politician.

Joseph Beckham Cobb was born on April 11, 1819, in Oglethorpe County, Georgia; George T. Buckley identifies Cobb's birthplace as near Lexington, Georgia. His father was Thomas W. Cobb. He attended a school in Willington, South Carolina, and the University of Georgia, leaving in 1838 without a degree. He married Almira Clayton on October 5, 1837.

Cobb moved to Mississippi in 1838 and was elected to the Mississippi Legislature in 1841, resigning in 1843. By 1844 he lived in Columbus, Mississippi, where he held a plantation. As of his death in 1858, his $117,000 estate included 1,500 acres of land and more than 100 enslaved persons.

Cobb published three books: The Creole (1850), a work of historical fiction; Mississippi Scenes (1851), a set of humorous observations about people and culture in Columbus; and Leisure Labors (1858), an essay collection. He published essays in magazines as well. Jay Broadus Hubbell describes Cobb's politics as "typical of the wealthy Whig planters" in that he opposed secession of the South from the United States. In Mississippi Scenes, he wrote about Indigenous people, including Choctaw, and Black enslaved people, in highly derogatory terms.

Cobb died on September 15, 1858.

Publications 

 "Uncle Billy Brown" (1847)
 The Creole; or, Siege of New Orleans (1850)
 Mississippi Scenes; or, Sketches of Southern and Western Life (1851)
 Leisure Labors; or, Miscellanies Historical, Literary, and Political (1858)

Citations

Works cited 
 
 
 

1819 births
1858 deaths
19th-century American male writers
American slave owners
Members of the Mississippi Legislature
Mississippi Whigs
People from Oglethorpe County, Georgia
University of Georgia alumni